Brett Scott (born 10 April 1962) is a former Australian rules footballer who played with the Sydney Football Club in the Victorian Football League during the 1980s.

Scott played his early football with The Rock-Yerong Creek before being recruited to South Melbourne and making his league debut in 1981. The following year the club relocated to Sydney and he took part in the inaugural game for their new city. Injuries restricted his appearances over the years and when he finished in 1989 he had managed just 59 senior games.

After Gary Buckenara was sacked as Sydney's coach in 1993, Scott acted as a caretaker coach for two games.

References

Brett Scott's coaching record at AFL Tables

1962 births
Living people
Australian rules footballers from New South Wales
Sydney Swans players
Sydney Swans coaches
New South Wales Australian rules football State of Origin players